Notaphily is the study and collection of paper currency, and banknotes. A notaphilist is a collector of banknotes or paper money, particularly as a hobby.

History
It is believed that people have been collecting paper money for as long as it has been in use. While people began collecting paper currency more systematically in the 1940s, the turning point occurred in the 1970s when notaphily was established as a separate area by collectors. 

The term was coined in 1970 by Robert Stanley, a linguist then employed as Public Relations Manager of the collectors and investments firm Stanley Gibbons, in a successful attempt to formalise and encourage interest in the area. The term 'philanoty' had been considered, but 'notaphily' was preferred because of its assonance with the familiar 'philately'.

At the same time, some developed countries such as the United States, Germany and France began publishing their respective national catalogues of paper money, which represented major points of reference literature.

In 1961, The International Bank Note Society, (IBNS), was formed as an international association of banknote collectors. Nowadays it has thousands of members from around the world. The IBNS publishes the quarterly IBNS Journal, holds regular mail bid auctions, and promotes lectures at congresses.

The major contributor to this study has been Albert Pick who published some of the earliest catalogues of paper money and through them explained the objective of collecting paper money and the definition of it. Albert Pick is also the author of the capital part of the Standard Catalog of World Paper Money, now a three-volume set which consists of thousands of pages of almost the entire collection of the world paper money that has ever existed and is updated annually. Almost every note of every country and many special and regional issues are cataloged following a unique format for each entry: [Country Name]P[unique number for the banknote edition]

The following note would thus be cataloged as "Yugoslavia P-87."

An important aspect of collecting banknotes is the condition of items. Banknotes in perfect condition (without any damage), that usually haven't circulated are rated as uncirculated (UNC) and that is the highest classification for a value that a banknote can have. In addition to that, the value for a specific note in the world paper money catalog is listed for UNC condition.

Authentication, grading and cataloging
Banknotes are usually graded on a descriptive scale of grades. These grades vary somewhat internationally, and as time goes on more grades have been added. The grades specified by the International Bank Note Society are as follows:

 Uncirculated (UNC) - refers to a banknote that is bright and has no handling damage, such as folds or creases, nor any cuts, stains, or rounded corners
 About uncirculated (AU) - a banknote that is still bright but has trivial handling damage, i.e. a light center fold (not a crease, which is a break of the fibres of the paper), without rounded corners.
 Extremely fine (XF or EF) - a banknote with one crease or up to three light folds. Paper still bright and attractive, very slight wear to corners allowed.
 Very Fine (VF) - Note still attractive, but possible slight dirt or smudging, may have several horizontal and/or vertical folds. Paper remains relatively crisp. No tears, but slight wear to edges and corners is allowable.
 Fine (F) - Paper is now slightly soft, considerable wear due to folds from use in circulation. Minor tears to note, not extending into the design. Clear but not bright in appearance. Staple holes but not holes due to folding.
 Very Good (VG) - Much wear. Paper is limp. Tears can extend into the design. Staining possible. Discoloration possible. Hole at center caused by folding allowable. Note still looks presentable.
 Good (G) - Very much wear, as VG, but more so. Graffiti on note. Small pieces of the note may be missing
 Fair - Larger pieces of note torn off/missing, compared with G. Less of the note intact.
 Poor - Severe damage due to wear, staining, missing pieces, graffiti and/or holes. May be taped together, have pieces missing. The worst possible condition.

In addition to these grades, it is common to indicate an in-between grade, such as AU-UNC, which is a note that falls between AU and UNC, (e.g., a note with a noticeable counting fold).

Certain vendors and auctioneers break the UNC grade down further, into three grades:

 Gem Uncirculated or Gem Crisp Uncirculated - A perfect note, not just in original condition, but with large equally balanced margins, outstanding colour. Thus such a note is not just as originally printed, but was also printed well in the first place.
 Choice Uncirculated/Crisp Choice Uncirculated - Just less than perfect, tiny foxing, faint counting smudges, or slightly off-center margins
 Uncirculated/Crisp Uncirculated - Still not folded or creased, but suffering from any of: slight fading, yellowing, foxing, very off-center margins, corner folds only in the blank area (not the design)

Most collectors will always prefer an Uncirculated note, and these notes command substantial premiums over lower grades. A note in UNC condition is generally worth up to ten times more in this condition compared with merely VG (Very Good). An UNC note can be worth three times as much as a VF one. For notes seldom found in uncirculated condition, the premium may be even higher. The difference between Gem Uncirculated and Uncirculated can also be substantial. As a result, buyers are at risk of grade inflation, in that a dealer failing to notice a fold in an AU note and passing it off as UNC will undoubtedly feel justified in charging a higher price.

Bank notes below VF are usually considered undesirable in a collection, and are generally purchased where better-quality examples are either unavailable due to their scarcity or simply beyond the collector's budget. Common notes in such poor condition, however, are effectively unsaleable for anything above their face value (assuming they are still legal tender).

Various third party grading companies (TPG) offer the service of authentication, grading and cataloging of common varieties of paper currency. These TPGs typically use a seventy-point grading scale to describe the note. Additional notations may be made for exceptional paper quality or other varieties.

Following examination, TPG companies typically encapsulate the currency in what is commonly referred to as a "slab."  Similar to the issues surrounding the transition that occurred within the coin collecting field many years ago, controversy exists about the need or value of TPG notes.  Without having the ability to closely examine and feel the note due to it being sealed inside the slab, many collectors are not comfortable accepting the opinion of others as to the grade and may either elect not to purchase the note or to cut it out of the slab for examination.  Additionally, many noted mistakes in grading by third party grading services have been discovered.  However, for collectors less adept at grading, purchasing a note in a slab can provide some additional comfort for the owner in justifying the purchase and cost.  It also serves to help protect the collector against unethical activities designed to increase the worth of the note by pressing out folds, washing, repairing tears, or other alterations typically viewed as unacceptable thereby lowering the value of the item.

The vast majority of banknotes are sold using the Uncirculated–Poor grading system, and are never graded with any third party.

Postal order collecting

Postal order collecting has become a branch of notaphily, especially in England since the 1980s. Some countries, such as Basutoland, the British Somaliland Protectorate, and Northern Rhodesia never issued their own banknotes, however, they did issue their own postal orders. Great Britain, the Isle of Man, and Northern Ireland also issued Old Age Pension Orders as well as postal orders. These have become collectible in recent years.

Specialties

People collect paper money by:
 Topic (wildlife, ships, famous people)
 Time period (series, date)
 Country (native, favourite or unusual)
 Substrate (paper or polymer)
 Currency
 Denomination
 Printer
 Serial number
 Grade
 Varieties caused by major or minor design changes
 Replacement or star notes commonly used to replace errors discovered during the printing process.
 Errors in the printing process

Bibliography
 Shishanov V. The Assignats of 1802-1803 // Journal of the Russian numismatic society. 1999. №68. P.58-69.
Notaphily of the European collector; https://notafilie.estranky.cz/

See also

Paper money catalogs
The Postal Order Society (Great Britain)

External links
Information
 First Ukrainian Banknotes
 World banknotes catalog

Organizations
 Atlantic Provinces Numismatic Association
 Canadian Paper Money Society
 International Bank Note Society
 Professional Currency Dealers Association
 Society of Paper Money Collectors

Numismatics
Postal orders
 Banknotes